Richard Tighe may refer to:

Richard Tighe (mayor) (died 1673), mayor of Dublin (1651–52), MP for the City of Dublin in the First Protectorate Parliament (1654–55) 
Richard Tighe (Privy Counsellor) (1678–1736), Privy Counsellors of Ireland (1718), MP of Newtownards (Parliament of Ireland constituency) (1715, 1725)